Borén is a locality located in the municipality of Alt Àneu, in Province of Lleida province, Catalonia, Spain. As of 2020, it has a population of 14.

Geography 
Borén is located 171km north-northeast of Lleida.

References

Populated places in the Province of Lleida